Kortwia-Abodom is a village in the Amansie West district, a district in the Ashanti Region of Ghana.

References

Populated places in the Ashanti Region